Abacetus vatovai is a species of ground beetle in the subfamily Pterostichinae. It was described by Straneo in 1941.

References

vatovai
Beetles described in 1941